Archduke Leopold Wilhelm of Austria (5 January 1614 – 20 November 1662), younger brother of Emperor Ferdinand III, was an Austrian soldier, administrator and patron of the arts.

He held a number of military commands, with limited success, and served as Governor of the Spanish Netherlands,  before returning to Vienna in 1656. Despite being nominated as Holy Roman Emperor after Ferdinand's death in 1657, he stood aside in favour of his nephew Leopold I.

His main interest was in art, and he patronised artists including David Teniers the Younger, Frans Snyders, Peter Snayers, Daniel Seghers, Peter Franchoys, Frans Wouters, Jan van den Hoecke and Pieter Thijs. His collection of 17th century Venetian and Dutch paintings are now held by the Kunsthistorisches Museum in Vienna.

Life

Born at Wiener Neustadt on 5 January, 1614, he was the sixth of seven children born to Emperor Ferdinand II (1578-1637) and his first wife, Maria Anna of Bavaria (1574–1616). His elder brother became Emperor Ferdinand III (1608–1657).

Career
As a younger son, Leopold was educated for the church but was never ordained. Despite not being a member of the clergy, he held various Prince-Bishoprics within the Holy Roman Empire to provide him an income: Halberstadt (1628–1648), Passau (1625–1662), Breslau (1656–1662), Olmütz (1637–1662) and Strasbourg (1626–1662). 

He was also appointed to the Bishopric of Halberstadt in 1627, Magdeburg in 1629 and Bremen in 1635. All three were in the Protestant north, where the infrastructure of the Catholic church had long since disappeared; he never exercised power and all three were secularised in 1648. He became the Grand Master of the Teutonic Order in 1641.

During his lifetime, the Habsburg rulers of Spain and the Holy Roman Empire faced the 1568 to 1648 Dutch Revolt, the 1618 to 1648 Thirty Years War and other conflicts, including the Franco-Spanish War (1635–1659). Despite his reluctance, Ferdinand made him Imperial commander in 1639, largely due to lack of reliable subordinates; he resigned following a disastrous defeat at Second Breitenfeld in 1642, a battle fought against the advice of his generals. 

He was re-appointed after another Imperial defeat at the 1645 Battle of Jankau, then Governor of the Spanish Netherlands in 1647. In that role, he helped  negotiate an end to the war in the 1648 Treaty of Westphalia; the Franco-Spanish war continued, obliging him to remain in Brussels until 1656.

Art collection

While in Brussels, he employed David Teniers the Younger as keeper of his collection, spending immense sums on works by Frans Snyders, Peter Snayers, Daniel Seghers, Peter Franchoys, Frans Wouters, Jan van den Hoecke, Pieter Thijs, Jan van de Venne and others. He also acquired a number of Italian masters, purchased from the sale of collections  owned by Bartolomeo della Nave and Charles I. His most prized pieces engraved in the book Theatrum Pictorium, which is often called the first "art catalogue". 

When the tomb of Childeric I, an early Merovingian king, was discovered in 1653 by a mason doing repairs in the church of Saint-Brice in Tournai, it was Leopold Wilhelm who had the find published in Latin. On his return to Vienna in 1656, his collection relocated to the Hofburg Palace, where Jan Anton van der Baren, a Flemish priest and artist, served as director. The collection was bequeathed to his nephew Leopold I, and is now part of the collections of the Kunsthistorisches Museum in Vienna. 

He played an active role in court politics and was close to his stepmother, Eleonora of Mantua (1598-1655), who shared his interest in Italian art and was a prominent supporter of the Catholic Counter-Reformation. Although suggested as a candidate to replace Ferdinand as Holy Roman Emperor in 1657, he ensured his nephew Leopold I was elected when he reached 18 in July 1658.

Ancestors

References

Sources
 
 
  (See index, v. 1, for more information on Leopold Wilhelm's patronage)

External links
 
 

1614 births
1662 deaths
17th-century House of Habsburg
17th-century Roman Catholic bishops in the Holy Roman Empire
Austrian princes
Bishops of Strasbourg
Field marshals of the Holy Roman Empire
Governors of the Habsburg Netherlands
Grand Masters of the Teutonic Order
People from Wiener Neustadt
Prince-Bishops of Breslau
Roman Catholic Prince-Archbishops of Bremen
Roman Catholic Prince-Bishops of Halberstadt
Military personnel of the Franco-Spanish War (1635–1659)
Burials at the Imperial Crypt
Burials at St. Stephen's Cathedral, Vienna
Sons of emperors
Sons of kings